The Nissan KR engine family consists of three and four-cylinder all-aluminum turbocharged gasoline engines in both 12-valve and 16-valve versions with a variable compression ratio and variable valve timing developed by Nissan.

KH5T 

The KH5T is a  DIG-T (Direct Injection Gasoline-Turbocharged) inline-3 12-valve engine, with a bore x stroke of .. This is achieved by the movement of an actuator which changes the length of the piston stroke according to the demand for power.

Applications:

KR15DDT 
The KR15DDT VC-Turbo 3 cylinder engine is firstly introduced in the fourth-generation X-Trail. Like the name VC-Turbo suggests, this engine uses a variable compression ratio that allows for high power output and high fuel efficiency at the same time. Due to this, this engine won Nissan the 19th trophy in the Wards 10 Best Engines and Propulsion systems awards of 2022; judge Drew Winter described it as “Very smooth, exceptionally quiet during idle, pleasant to drive in traffic or on the highway”, among other comments from judges such as “This engine inspires words that never have been uttered in the same sentence as 3-cylinder engine”.

Applications:
 2021–present Nissan Rogue/X-Trail/ X-Trail e-power (T33) ,

KR20DDET 
The KR20DDET was announced at the 2016 Paris Motor Show as the VC Turbo which had Nissan's new variable compression technology. The engine was introduced to Nissan's production cars in 2019 in the Infiniti QX50 and the Nissan Altima replacing the previous V6 options. It was touted as the world’s first production-ready variable compression ratio engine.

Applications:
 2017–present Infiniti QX50 (J55)
 2021–present Infiniti QX55 (J55)
 2022–present Infiniti QX60 (L51) (China)
 2018–present Nissan Altima (L34)

See also
List of Nissan engines

References

Nissan engines
Straight-three engines
Straight-four engines
Gasoline engines by model